France Aviation Civile Services, formerly DSNA Services, is a Groupement d'intérêt économique, created by the DGAC and the ENAC in 2013. It offers to international clients the expertise of French civil aviation in areas related to regulation, supervision security and air navigation.

Its president is Mr. Farid Zizi, former president of the ICAO Air Navigation Commission.

Activities 
France Aviation Civile Services is involved in several types of activities: safety regulation and supervision, airspace restructuring, modernization of air navigation services... In collaboration with ENAC, it provides training for air traffic controllers. The company produces databases on airports and airlines. It also offers AFIS services.

Notes

External links 
 

Aviation in France
Government agencies of France
Aviation organizations
École nationale de l'aviation civile
Air navigation service providers
Organizations established in 2013